The 2009 Men's under-19 World Floorball Championships were the fifth world championships in men's under-19 floorball. The tournament took place between 6 and 10 May 2009 in Raisio and Turku, Finland.

All matches except for the final were played in the Kerttulan Liikuntahalli in Raisio, Finland. The B-Division final took place in the Turkuhalli in Turku, Finland.

Tournament information

Facts and history
The 2009 Men's under-19 World Floorball Championships are the first men's under-19 floorball championships that will be held in the month of May, after the International Floorball Federation (IFF) changed their international tournament calendar format last year. Previously, the tournament was hosted in the months of either October or November.

The tournament is also the first under-19 world floorball championships in which a North American team (Canada) will participate in. In addition to that, it is also the first in which qualifying was needed in order to determine the teams in the B-Division. Hungary and Russia qualified to play in the tournament after finishing in the top 2 during the 2009 Men's under-19 World Floorball Championships Qualifying, which took place in Kartal, Hungary from 10 to 14 September 2008.

News
On 8 December 2008, the International Floorball Federation (IFF) and the 2009 men's under-19 world floorball championships organizing committee released the schedule for the tournament. The schedule was reviewed and subsequently released by the IFF Rules and Competition Committee (RACC).
The International Floorball Federation (IFF) has yet to release any team rosters as of 1 April 2009.

Preliminary round

Group C

Group D

Placement round

15th place match

13th place match

Playoffs

Semi-finals

11th place match

B-Division final (9th place match)

Final standings

 are promoted to the A-division for U19 WFC 2011.

See also
2009 Men's under-19 World Floorball Championships
2009 Men's under-19 World Floorball Championships Qualifying

References

External links
Official Website
Standings & Statistics – Qualifiers

|-style="text-align: center; background: #ffa07a;"
|align="center" colspan="3"|Men's under-19 World Floorball Championships

under-19
Mens Under-19 World Floorball Championships B-division, 2009
Floorball
2009 in Finnish sport
Floorball in Finland
2000s in Turku
May 2009 sports events in Europe
Raisio